Minecraft – Volume Alpha is the second studio album and first soundtrack album by German electronic musician Daniel Rosenfeld, known by his pseudonym C418. It was digitally released on 4 March 2011 independently as the first installment of the soundtrack for the video game Minecraft. Since 2015, the album has been physically released by record label Ghostly.

Volume Alpha comprises most of the music featured in the game, as well as other music included in trailers and instrumentals that were not included in the game's final release. In 2022, the album peaked at number five on the US Billboard Dance/Electronic Albums chart, and was nominated for the category at the Billboard Music Awards of 2022.

Background 
In early 2009, Rosenfeld began collaborating with Minecraft creator Markus Persson through internet forum TIGSource. He was given responsibility for developing the music and sound effects of the still in-development game. Rosenfeld was forced to adapt to Java's "terrible sound engine" and took inspiration from Dwarf Fortress in creating the soundtrack, due to its "lovely guitar music" despite the game's "basic ASCII art for imagery".

Composition and release 
Deciding to "work with experimental simplistic acoustic music that doesn’t actually tell you anything about the game”, a key objective of Rosenfeld's work was to be unobtrusive, explaining "I almost hoped that [players would] only notice [the music] when something interesting happens in the game".

Rosenfeld composed the soundtrack using Ableton Live along with "a ton of extra software and plugins" and synthesisers including a Moog Voyager. He took inspiration from the soundtrack of Blueberry Garden, which he described as "piano music [recorded with] a really terrible microphone on top of the piano". Experimenting with this technique, Rosenfeld claimed the final release consists of "about 80 percent electronic and 20 percent acoustic".

On 21 August 2015, the first physical releases of Minecraft – Volume Alpha were released by record label Ghostly, as an LP and CD. The LP version features a much more sparse track listing compared to the original digital release.

The album's artwork features a 3D model of a block of grass from Minecraft. On some vinyl pressings, lenticular printing is used to give depth to the blocks in the image. Since the first pressing, Ghostly has re-released the album multiple times due to high demand.

Critical reception 

Andy Kellman of AllMusic praised its replay value, stating that "none of the recurring elements is pronounced or simple enough to become fatiguing with repeated play".

Mojo wrote that "Minecraft's huge audience makes the contents of Volume Alpha some of the most influential pieces of music of recent times. Some of the loveliest, too."

Keith Stuart of the Guardian praised the album for acting as the "perfect accompaniment" to Minecraft. Stuart compared his compositions to those of Brian Eno and Erik Satie because of their minimalistic, ambient qualities.

Legacy 
Minecraft – Volume Alpha has been cited as a popular album for studying, especially for teenagers and young adults. In 2019, the University of Delaware's magazine The Review called the soundtrack "arguably the best ambient album to be released this decade", citing “Sweden” and “Mice on Venus” as "perfect ambient songs for studying".

The album has received enduring praise from listeners for encompassing "nostalgia in its purest form". In 2018, Jamie Hornsey of the Boar wrote "I can’t think of another game where the memories are as vivid as these", citing C418's Minecraft – Volume Alpha as a key factor.

Track listing 

Digital download and CD
 "Key" – 1:05
 "Door" – 1:51
 "Subwoofer Lullaby" – 3:28
 "Death" – 0:41
 "Living Mice" – 2:57
 "Moog City" – 2:40
 "Haggstrom" – 3:24
 "Minecraft" – 4:14
 "Oxygène" – 1:05
 "Équinoxe" – 1:54
 "Mice on Venus" – 4:41
 "Dry Hands" – 1:08
 "Wet Hands" – 1:30
 "Clark" – 3:11
 "Chris" – 1:27
 "Thirteen" – 2:56
 "Excuse" – 2:04
 "Sweden" – 3:35
 "Cat" – 3:06
 "Dog" – 2:25
 "Danny" – 4:14
 "Beginning" – 1:42
 "Droopy Likes Ricochet" – 1:36
 "Droopy Likes Your Face" – 1:56

Duration – 58:59
LP

Side A

 "Subwoofer Lullaby" – 3:28
 "Living Mice" – 2:57
 "Moog City" – 2:40
 "Haggstrom" – 3:24
 "Minecraft" – 4:14
 "Clark" – 3:11

Side B

 "Mice on Venus" – 4:41
 "Dry Hands" – 1:08
 "Wet Hands" – 1:30
 "Sweden" – 3:35
 "Cat" – 3:06
 "Danny" – 4:14

Duration – 38:08
Notes

 Songs from this album featured in Minecraft do not take the track names on C418's release. Instead, for example, "Subwoofer Lullaby" is known as "hal1", and "Minecraft" is "calm1".
 "Droopy Likes Ricochet" and "Droopy Likes Your Face" are taken from C418's 2010 album, Life Changing Moments Seem Minor In Pictures.
 "Oxygène" and "Équinoxe" are references to Jean-Michel Jarre's 1976 and 1978 albums of the same name.

Awards and nominations

Charts

Release history

References 

2011 albums
Video game music
Electronic albums by German artists
Ambient albums by German artists
Minecraft